Corazzatocarcinus is an extinct genus of Cretaceous crabs. This genus include the species Corazzatocarcinus hadjoulae Roger 1946.

Fossil record
 Corazzatocarcinus  is known in Cretaceous of Lebanon (from about 99.7 to 94.3  million years ago).

References 

Crabs